Planet Muscle was an American bodybuilding and fitness magazine, established by Jeff Everson in 2002. It also had a German website. It was ranked as amongst the top bodybuilding magazines and was published six times a year. It was formerly published on a quarterly basis.

Planet Muscle folded in 2014.

References

External links
Planet Muscle preserved at Internet Archive

2002 establishments in the United States
2014 disestablishments in the United States
Bimonthly magazines published in the United States
Quarterly magazines published in the United States
Sports magazines published in the United States
Bodybuilding magazines
Defunct magazines published in the United States
Fitness magazines
Magazines established in 2002
Magazines disestablished in 2014